Randy Neal Manery (born January 10, 1949) is a Canadian former professional ice hockey defenceman.

Manery started his National Hockey League career with the Detroit Red Wings in 1970. He also played for the Atlanta Flames and Los Angeles Kings.  He retired from the NHL after the 1980 season. Manery was the first player to represent the Atlanta Flames in an NHL All-Star Game.

Born in Leamington, Ontario, Manery currently resides in Waxhaw, North Carolina with his wife, Linda. Manery is the Director of International Development for CURE International and serves as the head of CURE International Canada. Randy is the brother of Kris Manery.

Career statistics

Regular season and playoffs

External links
 

1949 births
Atlanta Flames players
Canadian ice hockey defencemen
Detroit Red Wings players
Fort Worth Wings players
Hamilton Red Wings (OHA) players
Ice hockey people from Ontario
Living people
Los Angeles Kings players
People from Leamington, Ontario
People from Buford, Georgia
People from Waxhaw, North Carolina
Sportspeople from the Atlanta metropolitan area